Farhan Zaman (born 9 March 1992 in Peshawar) is a professional squash player who represents Pakistan. He reached a career-high world ranking of World No. 47 in January 2017. He reached No. 3 in Junior Squash. He currently resides in Peshawar, Pakistan .

References

External links 
  (archive 3)
 
 

1992 births
Living people
Pakistani male squash players
Commonwealth Games competitors for Pakistan
Squash players at the 2018 Commonwealth Games
Asian Games competitors for Pakistan
Squash players at the 2014 Asian Games
South Asian Games medalists in squash
South Asian Games silver medalists for Pakistan